Austrozephyrus is a genus of butterflies in the family Lycaenidae. The three species are found in the Indomalayan realm.

Species
Austrozephyrus absolon (Hewitson, 1865)
A. a. absolon Peninsular Malaya
A. a. albifasciatus Howarth, 1957 Java
A. a. thamar (Toxopeus, 1935) Sumatra 
A. a. acosmeta (Toxopeus, 1935) Java
Austrozephyrus borneanus (Pendlebury, 1939) Borneo Palawan
Austrozephyrus reginae Schröder & Treadaway, 1982 Palawan

References

Theclini
Lycaenidae genera
Taxa named by Graham Howarth